Charles Addison Russell (March 2, 1852 – October 23, 1902) was a U.S. Representative from Connecticut.

Biography 
Born in Worcester, Massachusetts, Russell attended the public schools.  He graduated from Yale College in 1873, and served as city editor of the Worcester Press from 1873 until 1879 and associate editor of the Worcester Spy in 1879 and 1880.  He moved to Killingly, Connecticut, in 1879 and engaged in the manufacture of woolen products.  He served as aide-de-camp on the staff of Gov. Hobart B. Bigelow in 1881.  He served as member of the Connecticut House of Representatives in 1883, and as Secretary of the State of Connecticut in 1885 and 1886.

He was elected as a Republican to the Fiftieth and to the seven succeeding Congresses and served from March 4, 1887, until his death.  He served as chairman of the Committee on Expenditures in the Department of War (Fifty-seventh Congress). He had been renominated as the Republican candidate for reelection in 1902.  He died in Killingly, Connecticut, on October 23, 1902.  He was interred in the High Street Cemetery, Dayville, Killingly, Connecticut.

See also
List of United States Congress members who died in office (1900–49)

References

 Memorial addresses on the life and character of Charles Addison Russell late a representative from Connecticut delivered in the House of Representatives and Senate frontispiece 1903

1852 births
1902 deaths
Politicians from Worcester, Massachusetts
Yale College alumni
Republican Party members of the Connecticut House of Representatives
Secretaries of the State of Connecticut
Republican Party members of the United States House of Representatives from Connecticut
19th-century American politicians